Liz Patu (born 15 July 1989) is an Australian rugby union player. She made her international debut against New Zealand in 2014. She plays Prop for the Queensland Reds in the Super W competition.

Biography 
Patu was born in Auckland but was raised in her native Samoa. She later migrated to Australia in 2004. She was selected for the Wallaroos 2014 Rugby World Cup squad. Patu also competed at the 2017 Rugby World Cup in Ireland. In 2018 she was named as captain ahead of their Test series against New Zealand.

Patu played against Japan who had not played a game since 2017. She featured again for Australia in 2019 against New Zealand in two test matches.

In 2019 Patu was given a six-week ban for biting Wallaroos team-mate Rebecca Clough in a Super W match.

Patu was named in Australia's squad for the 2022 Pacific Four Series in New Zealand. She was named in the Wallaroos squad for a two-test series against the Black Ferns for the Laurie O'Reilly Cup.

Patu appeared in her third, and final, Rugby World Cup when she was selected in the team for the delayed tournament in New Zealand. She later announced her retirement from the Wallaroos in December.

References

External links
Wallaroos Profile

1989 births
Living people
Australia women's international rugby union players
Australian female rugby union players